Around the World in 80 Ways is an Australian comedy film directed by Stephen MacLean completed in 1986 but only released in 1988. It stars Philip Quast, Gosia Dobrowolska, Kelly Dingwall, Allan Penney and Rob Steele, and was the only feature film directed by MacLean.

The plot is about two men who try to trick their grandfather Roly Davis (Allan Penney), who has dementia and is almost blind, into thinking he has travelled around the world. Roly is shocked to discover that his wife Mavis (Diana Davidson) has gone on holiday around the world with his neighbour and rival in business, Alec Moffatt (Rob Steele). His sons, Wally (Philip Quast), a tourism operator whose business is not going well, and Eddie (Kelly Dingwall, son of filmmaker John Dingwall), an unemployed sound engineer, concoct a scheme that will fool their grandfather into thinking that he is going overseas looking for Mavis. To this end, they create, within their family home and Moffatt's macmansion, fake versions of Honolulu, Las Vegas, Rome and Tokyo, assisted by a nurse, Ophelia Cox (Gosia Dobrowolska). Along the way, Eddie and Ophelia fall in love, and the sons grow closer to their father.

Despite some good reviews the film was not a success at the box office. Producer David Elfick blamed this in part on the title, which he felt was confusing. Film critic Richard Kuipers praised the film and said that its lack of renown was at least partly due to it "troubled distribution history". Although actually completed in 1986, it had its first release in the US in March 1988, followed by only a limited rollout in Australian cinemas later in the year.

References

External links

Around the World in 80 Ways at Australian Screen Online
Around the World in 80 Ways at Oz Movies

Australian comedy films
Films scored by Chris Neal (songwriter)
1980s English-language films